Fast Web Media is a Manchester-based marketing agency. The company provides digital marketing services, specialising in SEO, technical development, design and UX, content and social media.

History
Founded in 1994, Fast Web Media (then known as Fleetness 202 and later as Hercules Communications) initially focused on website development, with one of its first projects being the production of the first Premier League website. In 1998, the company was bought by Fast Search & Transfer ASA (now known as Microsoft Development Center Norway), a major infrastructure corporation focusing on internet search as well as image and video software.

Over the years, Fast Web Media has worked with a number of clients from a wide range of different industries, most notably:

 BBC
 blu E-Cigarettes
 Bravissimo
 Carling
 Cobra
 Coors Light
 Gfinity
 Pravha
 Premier League
 PZ Cussons

Michael Flynn  CEO, sold the business to Mporium PLC 15 May 2015, staying with the new business for a handover period until December 2015. In November 2017, Fast Web Media returned to Manchester city centre from Salford, with its office in the same building where the company was first registered more than 20 years before.

In July 2019, Fast Web Media was acquired by Inc & Co Group.

Locations
Fast Web Media has had a range of different offices in the Manchester and Salford areas, with the most recent being:

 Ducie House, Ducie Street, Manchester (1996 - 1999)
 Sunlight House, Quay Street, Manchester (1999 - 2008)
 Armstrong House, Brancaster Road, Manchester (2008 - 2011)
 Digital World Centre, Lowry Plaza, Salford (2011 - 2017)
 Waterhouse, Spring Gardens, Manchester (2017–Present)

References

Companies based in Manchester
Digital marketing companies of the United Kingdom
Search engine optimization companies